Thomas Foxe (1 June 1937 – 8 February 2000) was an Irish Independent politician and former owner of Tom Foxe's Bar in Roscommon Town in County Roscommon, where Foxe was from.

Foxe was elected to Dáil Éireann as an independent Teachta Dála (TD) on his first attempt, at the 1989 general election, when he stood as an independent candidate in the Roscommon constituency. He unseated the sitting Fianna Fáil TD and former minister Seán Doherty.

He was re-elected at the 1992 general election, for the new constituency of Longford–Roscommon, but lost his seat at the 1997 general election.

At the 1991 local elections, he was elected to Roscommon County Council for Roscommon town, and served until his death on 8 February 2000.

References

1937 births
2000 deaths
Independent TDs
Local councillors in County Roscommon
Members of the 26th Dáil
Members of the 27th Dáil